Andrew Parlby Walton (born 28 February 1965) is a Zimbabwean born former English cricketer.  Walton was a right-handed batsman who bowled right-arm medium pace.

Walton represented the Kent Cricket Board in 3 List A matches.  These came against the Worcestershire Cricket Board, the Warwickshire Cricket Board and Hampshire, all in the 2000 NatWest Trophy.  In his 3 List A matches, he scored 13 runs at a batting average of 4.33, with a high score of 8.  In the field he took a single catch.  With the ball he took 4 wickets at a bowling average of 22.25, with best figures of 3/31.

In February 2020, he was named in Zimbabwe's squad for the Over-50s Cricket World Cup in South Africa. However, the tournament was cancelled during the third round of matches due to the coronavirus pandemic.

References

External links
Andrew Walton at Cricinfo
Andrew Walton at CricketArchive

1965 births
Living people
English people of Zimbabwean descent
English cricketers
Zimbabwean cricketers
Zimbabwean emigrants to the United Kingdom
Kent Cricket Board cricketers